Estadio Olímpico, commonly referred to as Estadio Olímpico de Riobamba to disambiguate it from other stadiums of a similar name, is a multi-use stadium in Riobamba, Ecuador.  It is currently used mostly for football matches and is the home stadium of Olmedo in addition to other lower division clubs in the city.  The stadium holds 14,400 spectators and opened in 1926.

References

Olimpico de Riobamba
Buildings and structures in Chimborazo Province